Acanthonotus is an extinct genus of bony fish. It contains three species, A. inflatus, A. niger, and A. tricuspis.

References
Zipcodezoo.com

Sparidae